Scholz is a German surname. It is the East Central German and Silesian version of the name Schulz, Schultz, Schultheiss.

Geographical distribution
As of 2014, 86.6% of all known bearers of the surname Scholz were residents of Germany, 5.8% of the United States, 1.7% of Austria, 1.1% of Brazil and 1.1% of Australia.

In Germany, the frequency of the surname was higher than national average in the following states:
 1. Saxony (1:315)
 2. Brandenburg (1:361)
 3. Saxony-Anhalt (1:429)
 4. Thuringia (1:518)
 5. Lower Saxony (1:541)
 6. North Rhine-Westphalia (1:695)

People
 Alexander Scholz (born 1992), a Danish footballer
 Anke Scholz (born 1978), a German swimmer
 Arnold Scholz (1904–1942), a German mathematician
 Barbara Scholz (1947–2011), an American philosopher of science
 Bernhard Scholz (1835–1916), a German composer
 Carter Scholz (born 1953), an American speculative fiction author and music composer
 Corinna Scholz (born 1989), a German curler
 Erhard Scholz (born 1947), a German historian of mathematics
 Franz Scholz (1909–1998), a German priest and professor of theology
  (1787—1830), a Russian conductor and composer
 Fritz von Scholz (1896–1944), an Austrian (Austro-Hungarian) Oberleutnant and later German SS-Commander
 Gene Scholz (1917–2005), an American professional basketball player
 Georg Scholz (1890–1945), a German painter
 Gudrun Scholz (born 1940), a former German field hockey player
 Heiko Scholz (born 1966), a former German footballer
 Heinrich Scholz (entomologist) (1812–1859), German physician and entomologist
 Heinrich Scholz (1884–1956), German theologian and logician
 Ingrid Scholz, a German rower
 Jackson Scholz (1897–1986), an American athlete
 János Scholz (c. 1904–1993), Hungarian-born American cellist and art collector
 Johann Martin Augustin Scholz (1794–1852), a German Bible scholar
 Katharina Scholz (born 1983), a German field hockey player
 Lilly Scholz (born 1903), an Austrian pair skater
 Michael Scholz (born 1949), a German singer, composer and producer
 Olaf Scholz (born 1958), current Chancellor of Germany
 Peta Scholz (née Squire, born 1976), an Australian netball player
 Robert O. Scholz (1895–1978), American architect
 Ronny Scholz (born 1978), a former professional road racing cyclist
 Rupert Scholz (born 1937), a German politician
 Tom Scholz (Donald Thomas Scholz, born 1947), an American rock musician, inventor, engineer, and philanthropist
 W. E. Scholz (19th century), German composers and conductor

See also 
 Scholz conjecture, after Arnold Scholz
 Scholz Garten, Beer Garden, in downtown Austin, Texas
 Scholz Research & Development
 Scholz's star, a star that passed near the Sun 70 000 years ago, named after its discoverer, German astronomer Ralf-Dieter Scholz

References

German-language surnames
Surnames of Silesian origin
Jewish surnames